Thai fried rice is a variety of fried rice typical of central Thai cuisine. In Thai, khao means "rice" and phat means "of or relating to being stir-fried".

This dish differs from Chinese fried rice in that it is prepared with Thai jasmine rice instead of regular long-grain rice. It normally contains meat (chicken, shrimp, and crab are all common), egg, onions, garlic and sometimes tomatoes. The seasonings, which may include soy sauce, sugar, salt, possibly some chili sauce, and the ubiquitous nampla (fish sauce), are stir-fried together with the other ingredients. The dish is then plated and served with accompaniments like cucumber slices, tomato slices, lime and sprigs of green onion and coriander, and phrik nampla, a spicy sauce made of sliced Thai chilies, chopped garlic cloves, fish sauce, lime juice and sugar.

Variants 
Thai fried rice has many variants denoted by main ingredient or region. Examples include: 
 Khao phat mu – pork fried rice
 Khao phat kai – chicken fried rice
 Khao phat thale – seafood fried rice
 Khao phat kung – shrimp fried rice
 Khao phat pu – fried rice with crab meat
 Khao phat pla krapong – fried rice with canned fish (usually sardines or mackerel in tomato sauce)
 Khao phat kak mu – fried rice with pork cracklings
 Khao phat naem – fried rice with naem, a type of fermented pork sausage
 Khao phat bekhon – bacon fried rice
 Khao phat khai – egg fried rice
 Khao phat kaphrao – basil fried rice
 Khao phat namliap – fried rice with Chinese olives
 Khao phat sapparot – pineapple fried rice, or a more elaborate version known as khao op sapparot, served inside a hollowed-out pineapple and garnished with raisins and cashew nuts
 Khao phat che – vegetarian fried rice
 khao phat tom yam – a type of fried rice that is adapted from tom yum soup and fried rice
 Khao phat kaeng khiao wan – fried rice mixed with green curry paste
 Khao phat nam phrik long ruea – fried rice mixed with nam phrik long ruea, a type of chili paste
 Khao phat rotfai ("train fried rice") – fried rice mixed with either dark soy sauce or red fermented bean curd
 Khao phat amerikan ("American fried rice") uses hot dogs, fried chicken, and eggs as side dishes or mixed into fried rice with ketchup added. It was served to U.S. soldiers in Thailand during the Vietnam War, but now has become common in Thailand. 
Khao khluk kapi – fried rice mixed with shrimp paste

See also

 American fried rice
 Fried rice
 List of fried rice dishes

References

External links 

Fried rice
Thai rice dishes